Harvard Stadium is a U-shaped college football stadium in the northeast United States, located in the Allston neighborhood of Boston, Massachusetts. The stadium is owned and operated by Harvard University and is home to the Harvard Crimson football program. The stadium's seating capacity is 30,323. 

Built in 1903, it was a pioneering execution of reinforced concrete in the construction of large structures. Because of its early importance in these areas, and its influence on the design of later stadiums, it was designated a National Historic Landmark in 1987. The stadium is the nation's oldest permanent concrete structure dedicated to intercollegiate athletics. It seated up to 57,166 in the past, as permanent steel stands (completing a straight-sided oval) were installed in the stadium's northeast end zone in 1929. They were torn down after the 1951 season, due to deterioration and reduced attendance. Afterward, there were smaller temporary steel bleachers across the stadium's open end until the building of the Murr Center (which is topped by the new scoreboard) in 1998.

Harvard Stadium hosted one Boston Patriots season in 1970. It was their first season in the NFL after the AFL–NFL merger and their last before becoming the New England Patriots. The team moved to Schaefer Stadium in Foxborough the following season.

History

Much of the funds raised came from a 25th reunion gift by Harvard's Class of 1879. It is the home of Harvard's football team. The stadium also hosted the Crimson track and field teams until 1984 and was the home of the Boston Patriots during the 1970 season, until Schaefer Stadium opened the following year to fulfill post-AFL–NFL merger minimum seating requirements requiring a 50,000+ seat venue. Harvard Stadium was the largest concrete stadium in the nation until the construction of Syracuse University's Archbold Stadium in 1907.

Lewis Jerome Johnson, professor of civil engineering at Harvard, was a consultant to the design team for the stadium. It is historically significant that this stadium represents the first vertical concrete structure to employ reinforced structural concrete. Prior to the erection of the stadium in 1902, reinforced structural concrete was used in horizontal, that is flooring, sidewalks, etc., design only. Prof. Johnson was the engineer of note responsible for incorporating the concept into the vertical structure of the stadium design. There is a plaque dedicating the stadium to his honor on the east end wall outside the stadium.

Harvard installed both FieldTurf and lights in 2006. In 2007, Harvard played its first night game at the stadium, winning 24–17 over Brown University on September 22.

Influence on American Football
In the early 20th century, American football was an extremely violent sport. 18 players died and 159 were seriously injured in 1905 alone.  There was a widespread movement to outlaw the game but U.S. President Theodore Roosevelt intervened and demanded the rules of the game be reformed. In 1906, Roosevelt met with representatives from 62 colleges and universities and formed the Intercollegiate Football Conference, the predecessor of the NCAA.  The committee's purpose was to develop a uniform set of rules and regulations to make the game safer.  A leading proposal, at the time, was widening the field to allow more running room and reduce serious collisions.  While it was popular among committee members, Harvard objected.  Their recently completed stadium could not accommodate a larger field.  Because of the permanent nature of Harvard Stadium, the proposal was rejected and the forward pass was legalized in April 1906.  Harvard Stadium led to the creation of two of the most fundamental aspects of modern American football: standard field dimensions and the legal forward pass.

Other events

Early in its existence two ice rinks were built on the stadium during the winter months for the men's ice hockey team. The Stadium served as the home for the hockey team until World War I.

Harvard Stadium was the site of the U.S. Olympic Trials for men's track and field in 1920, 1924, and 1928.

It is also the host of music festivals like the Amandla Festival, where Jamaican reggae legend Bob Marley performed a historic concert in 1979. Janis Joplin performed her last show at the stadium in 1970, shortly before her death. Other concerts included those by Miles Davis, Ray Charles, Van Morrison, The Band, B.B. King, Ike & Tina Turner, James Taylor, Joan Baez, Sly and the Family Stone, Rahsaan Roland Kirk, The Supremes, Mountain, Ten Years After and Johnny Mathis. During the 1984 Summer Olympics held in Los Angeles, the stadium hosted several soccer preliminaries. In 2007, the Boston Cannons, a professional lacrosse team for Major League Lacrosse, moved their home site to the stadium. They previously played at Boston University's Nickerson Field. They have since moved to Quincy, MA. 

Harvard installed FieldTurf and lights in 2006.

Beginning on April 11, 2009, Harvard Stadium became the home field of the Boston Breakers of the Women's Professional Soccer (WPS) league when they beat Saint Louis Athletica 2–0.

Soccer 
Soccer games played at Harvard Stadium during the 1984 Summer Olympics

Location
Although most of Harvard's campus is in Cambridge, the stadium and most other intercollegiate athletic facilities, along with Harvard Business School, lie to the south, across the Charles River, in the nearby Allston neighborhood of Boston.  The stadium is the most iconic piece of the Soldiers Field athletic complex, which also includes the baseball stadium, outdoor track, an artificial turf field hockey/lacrosse field, two soccer stadiums, pools, Beren Tennis Center (outdoor), the Gordon Indoor Track, Dillon Fieldhouse, Lavietes Pavilion, and Bright Hockey Center.  Newell Boathouse, home of Harvard's men's crew, lies across Soldiers Field Road on the banks of the Charles.

The stadium's horseshoe opens to the northeast, towards the river, and the press box is at the top of the northwest sideline's grandstand.
The running track has been removed; it was non-standard, with long straights and tight turns, and the outside lanes were very near the stadium walls.

Gallery

See also
 Harvard Crimson
 List of NCAA Division I FCS football stadiums
 List of National Historic Landmarks in Massachusetts
 National Register of Historic Places listings in northern Boston, Massachusetts

References

External links

 

American football venues in Boston
Boston Cannons venues
Former Major League Lacrosse venues
Defunct National Football League venues
New England Patriots stadiums
Harvard Crimson football venues
Venues of the 1984 Summer Olympics
Olympic football venues
Lacrosse venues in Massachusetts
National Historic Landmarks in Boston
Sports venues in Boston
Sports venues completed in 1903
Buildings and structures in Boston
Boston Breakers
Soccer venues in Massachusetts
Women's Professional Soccer stadiums
Sports venues on the National Register of Historic Places in Massachusetts
Boston Brawlers
National Register of Historic Places in Boston
1903 establishments in Massachusetts